The Copa Piauí was a tournament organized by Federação de Futebol do Piauí in order to decide how club would be the representative of the state at the Campeonato Brasileiro Série C (2006–2007), Campeonato Brasileiro Série D (2008–2013) and Copa do Brasil (2015–2017).

List of champions

References

Football in Piauí